The Empress is a 1917 American silent drama film directed by Alice Guy and starring Doris Kenyon, Holbrook Blinn and William A. Morse.

Cast
 Doris Kenyon as Nedra 
 Holbrook Blinn as Eric 
 William A. Morse as DeBaudry 
 Lyn Donelson as The Woman in the Dark

References

Bibliography

External links
 

1917 films
1917 drama films
1910s English-language films
American silent feature films
Silent American drama films
American black-and-white films
Films directed by Alice Guy-Blaché
Pathé Exchange films
1910s American films